was established on November 1, 1923 and dedicated to General Nogi Maresuke (63) and his wife Nogi Shizuko (53) after their death on September 13, 1912. The Tokyo Mayor, Baron Yoshio Sakatani, took the initiative to organise the Chūō Nogi Kai (Central Nogi Association) to build a shrine to the couple within their residence. It is located in Tokyo, Japan.

The shrine compound includes an example of Western architecture constructed during the Meiji period. It is famous as the site where General Nogi and his wife chose to kill themselves after the Meiji Emperor's death. The shrine was opened soon after this event but was destroyed during the 1945 air raids on May 25, 1945. The present shrine was built in 1962.

There,  is celebrated as a Shinto kami. There are several Nogi Shrines in Japan including the following locations:

Nasushiobara, Tochigi Prefecture
Fushimi-ku, Kyoto
Shimonoseki, Yamaguchi Prefecture
Hannō, Saitama Prefecture

Address
8-11-27 Akasaka, Minato-ku, Tokyo 107-0052
Beppyo shrines

Access
 a one-minute walk from Nogizaka Station on the Tokyo Metro Chiyoda Line (exit 1)

See also

Togo Shrine

References

 

Shinto shrines in Tokyo
Buildings and structures in Japan destroyed during World War II
Religious buildings and structures completed in 1962
1923 establishments in Japan